Urarte is a hamlet and council located in the municipality of Bernedo, in Álava province, Basque Country, Spain. As of 2020, it has a population of 30.

Geography 
Urarte is located 29km south-southeast of Vitoria-Gasteiz.

References

Populated places in Álava